Capio is a private healthcare company that provides healthcare in medicine, surgery and psychiatry at health centers, specialist clinics and hospitals in Sweden, Norway, Denmark, Germany and France. The Capio Group was founded in 1994 as a subsidiary of the investment company Bure Equity. In the following years, the company expanded to Norway, the United Kingdom, France and Germany.

Since November 2018, Capio is part of Ramsay Générale de Santé, creating a provider of healthcare services in Europe with combined net sales of EUR 3.8 billion and approximately 36,000 employees. The healthcare operations in France is since operating under the Ramsay Santé brand. Thomas Berglund was the company's President and CEO for 10 years, till 2018.

References

External links 
 Capio
Ramsay Santé

1994 establishments in Sweden
Apax Partners companies
Companies based in Gothenburg
Swedish  companies established in 1994
Health care companies of Sweden
Companies formerly listed on Nasdaq Stockholm